Tongues is the eighth studio album by American rapper Esham. It was released in 2001 via Gothom, marking the return of Esham's old horror/devil sound. It features guest appearances from Natas, The Dayton Family, Kool Keith, Violent J of Insane Clown Posse, Brittany Hurd, Heather Hunter, Jill O'Neil, Mujahid and Santos. The album peaked at #195 on the Billboard 200 albums chart in the United States.

Track listing 

Total Length: 1:11:59

Personnel
Esham - vocals, engineering, mixing, mastering, design, layout, producer
Santos - vocals, engineering, mixing, mastering, design, layout, photography
The Dayton Family - vocals
Heather Hunter - vocals
Kool Keith - vocals
Mastamind - vocals
Violent J - vocals
TNT - vocals

Charts

References

External links

2001 albums
Esham albums
Horrorcore albums
Albums produced by Esham
Reel Life Productions albums